The Private Secretary is a 1953 German comedy film directed by Paul Martin and starring Sonja Ziemann, Rudolf Prack and Paul Hörbiger. It was a remake of the 1931 German film The Private Secretary.

It was shot at the Wandsbek Studios and on location in Hamburg. The film's sets were designed by Hermann Warm and Alfons Windau.

Cast
 Sonja Ziemann as Gerda Weber
 Rudolf Prack as Direktor Erich Delbrück
 Paul Hörbiger as Portier Julius
 Werner Fuetterer as Ostermann
 Gerty Godden as Fräulein Petzold
 Margaret Cargill as Fräulein Hartmann
 Else Reval as Pensionsinhaberin Schott
 Ruth Stephan as Lissy

References

External links

1953 films
1953 romantic comedy films
German romantic comedy films
West German films
Films directed by Paul Martin
1950s German-language films
Remakes of German films
Films based on Hungarian novels
Films shot in Hamburg
Films shot at Wandsbek Studios
Films scored by Paul Abraham
German black-and-white films
1950s German films